Dittrichia viscosa, also known as false yellowhead, woody fleabane, sticky fleabane and yellow fleabane, is a flowering plant in the daisy family.

Dittrichia viscosa is a highly branching perennial common throughout the Mediterranean Basin. It has long, narrow leaves that are pointed at both ends and have teeth along the edges and glandular hairs on the surfaces. One plant can produce many yellow flower heads each with as many as 16 ray florets and 44 disc florets.

Originally, the species was found mainly in dry riverbeds and abandoned fields up to a 1500 m (5000 feet) elevation. Nowadays it is quite common in roadsides and ruderal habitats, even in urban areas. It is considered an invasive species in Australia. The false yellowhead is a tough plant, very resistant to adverse conditions and degraded environments. It is important as food for the caterpillars of certain butterflies and moths, like Iolana iolas. The galls of the plants also are habitat for Myopites stylatus and Myopites inulaedyssentericae, both predators on the olive fly, which may be cause for its name in Catalán: Olivarda.

Despite the fresh-looking green color of its leaves and its attractive inflorescence, this plant is sticky and has a certain smell that most people find unpleasant. It contains an essential oil and has been used in traditional medicine since ancient times, especially in the Levant, as an astringent. A yellow dye substance has, since ancient times, been produced from its roots.

It is an important plant in Catalan tradition, often mentioned in adages and proverbs. One adage says that: "No vos 'nemoreu, amor,de cap fadrina gallarda que és com la flor d'olivarda molt guapa, i dolenta d'olor."  [My dear one, don't fall in love with any woman who only has good looks, she is like a false yellowhead flower: beautiful, but full of stench.]

Subspecies
Dittrichia viscosa subsp. angustifolia (Bég.) Greuter
Dittrichia viscosa subsp. maritima (Brullo & De Marco) Greuter
Dittrichia viscosa subsp. revoluta (Hoffmanns. & Link) P.Silva & Tutin 
Dittrichia viscosa subsp. viscosa

Leaves, flowers and fruits

References

External links

Universitat de las Illes Balears- Herbari virtual - Dittrichia viscosa (L.) Greuter in Catalan with photo

Inuleae
Plants described in 1753
Taxa named by Carl Linnaeus
Plant dyes
Flora of Malta